Jung, also spelled Jeong or Jong, Chung, Chong is a single-syllable Korean given name, and an element in many two-syllable Korean given names. Its meaning differs based on the hanja used to write it. There are 84 hanja with the reading "jung" on the South Korean government's official list of hanja which may be used in given names.

People
People with the single-syllable given name Jeong include:
Jeong of Balhae (died 812), seventh King of Balhae
Yi Chong (1541–1622), Joseon Dynasty male painter
Heo Jeong (1896–1988), Korean male independence activist and South Korean politician
Kang Jeong (born 1971), South Korean male poet
Suh Jung (born 1972), South Korean actress
Jang Jeong (born 1980), South Korean female golfer
Choi Jeong (born 1987), South Korean male baseball player
Kim Jong (table tennis) (born 1989), North Korean female table tennis player
Choi Jeong (Go player) (born 1996), South Korean female go player

As a name element
According to South Korean government data, many names containing the element "Jung" were popular for newborn Korean boys and girls in the mid-to-late 20th century, but by 1990, no name containing this element appeared in the top 10. Popular names included:

Masculine
Jung-ho (5th place in 1950, 4th place in 1960, 7th place in 1970)
Jung-hoon (10th place in 1960, 1st place in 1970, 3rd place in 1980)

Feminine
Jung-hee (4th place in 1950, 6th place in 1960)
Jeong-ja (6th place in 1940)
Jung-sook (4th place in 1940, 2nd place in 1950)
Jung-soon (9th place in 1940)
Hyun-jung (2nd place in 1970, 10th place in 1980)
Eun-jung (3rd place in 1970, 6th place in 1980)

Other names beginning this element include:

Jung-ah (feminine)
Jung-eun (unisex)
Jung-hwa (feminine)
Jung-hwan (masculine)
Jeong-hyo (unisex)
Jung-hyun (unisex)
Jung-il (masculine)
Jung-jin (masculine)
Jung-mo (masculine)
Jung-min (masculine)
Jung-myung (masculine)
Jung-nam (masculine)
Jung-sik (masculine)
Jung-soo (masculine)
Jung-won (unisex)
Jung-woo (masculine)

Other names ending with this element include:

Ae-jung (feminine)
Hee-jung (unisex)
Ho-jung (masculine)
Hye-jung (feminine)
Ki-jung (masculine)
Mi-jung (feminine)
Min-jung (feminine)
Soo-jung (feminine)
Yoo-jung (feminine)
Yoon-jung (unisex)

See also
List of Korean given names

References

Korean given names